Rodel Pacheco Nacianceno (born November 1, 1981), known professionally as Coco Martin, is a Filipino actor, director, and film producer. He is best known for playing the lead roles in television series, such as Minsan Lang Kita Iibigin, Walang Hanggan, Ikaw Lamang, Juan dela Cruz, FPJ's Ang Probinsyano and FPJ's Batang Quiapo.

With a career spanning two decades, Martin is regarded as the country's "Ultimate Superstar". He has won 2 FAMAS Awards, 2 Gawad Urian Awards and 3 Golden Screen Awards. As of 2021, Martin has grossed 2.3 billion at the box-office, making him one of the top earning actors of the last ten years. At the 34th Gawad Urian Awards, he was recognized as the "Actor of the Decade". He is also recognized as the most awarded actor of his generation, with 119 awards and recognitions and 40 nominations from various award-giving bodies since 2006. 

In 2017, Martin starred as the titular character in the Ang Panday reboot, while also serving as the director, marking his directorial debut. He is credited under his real name, Rodel Nacianceno for his roles as director. Martin is the chairman of his own production company, CCM Film Productions, a company that he established in 2017.

Early life 
Rodel Pacheco Nacianceno was born in Santa Cruz, Manila, to Maria Teresa (née Pacheco) and Ramon Nacianceno. He was young when his parents separated causing his grandmother, Matilde, to care for him.  He was raised in Novaliches, Quezon City, and would later admit that he spent most of his time on the streets to make ends meet.  During these years, he would often go to the Quiapo Church in Manila with his grandmother to seek guidance from the Black Nazarene. Despite poor living conditions, he was able to attend elementary and high school at Capitol Institute in Novaliches. Martin earned a degree in hotel and restaurant management from the National College of Business and Arts in Fairview, Quezon City. To sustain his studies, Martin worked distributing flyers, as a barista, a merchandiser, a waiter, and a driver. After finishing college, he flew to Alberta, Canada, where he worked as a janitor at a bingo parlor. A widowed Filipino-Canadian woman promised to help him secure employment legally if he would work as her housekeeper, but the arrangement was unsuccessful. Martin eventually returned to janitorial work, and after nine months, returned home to the Philippines.

Career

2001–2004: Early work and career beginnings
Martin started his career in one of the ABS-CBN's talent agencies, Star Magic, as part of the Star Circle Batch 9 in 2001 alongside Angel Locsin, Rafael Rosell, Janus Del Prado, Heart Evangelista, Princess Schuck, and Alwyn Uytingco. He made his acting debut under his real name, Rodel Nacianceno, with a cameo appearance in the 2001 film Luv Text starring Judy Ann Santos . Later that year, he got a minor role in the 2001 film Lakas at Pag-ibig under the name Rodel Salvador. 2002 marked the first time Rodel appeared under stage name Coco Martin in the film Ang Agimat: Anting-anting ni Lolo under Imus Productions. After minor roles in films, Martin began appearing in TV advertisements and print ads. He got his big break in 2004, when the TV personality German Moreno included him as a star on his reality show Walang Tulugan with the Master Showman. He was later scouted for a role in an independent film.

2005–2008: Indie films and career breakthrough
Martin's big break came when he landed the lead role in the 2005 indie film, Masahista (The Masseur). The film was  directed by Brillante Mendoza, who was making his directorial debut under Gee Films Productions International and Centerstage Productions. It was a film about a young man who gives massages to gay men in exchange of extra service. The film was critically acclaimed, winning Best Movie and gave Martin his first Best Actor Award at the 2006 Young Critics Circle. The film also won the most coveted Golden Leopard Award at the 58th Locarno International Film Festival in Switzerland. In 2006, he starred in another indie film Summer Heat, released locally as "Kaleldo" also directed by Brillante Mendoza. The film earned multiple nominations at the FAMAS Awards, Gawad Urian Awards and won the critic's prize for the Network for the Promotion of Asian Cinema (NETPAC) at 2007 Jeonju International Film Festival in South Korea. In 2007, Martin starred in the film "Siquijor: Mystic Island" directed by Mark Philip Espina, and had a cameo role for a Seiko Films' produced indie film, Foster Child. In the same year, Martin top-billed another indie film "Tirador" directed by Mendoza along with Jiro Manio, which shows the political undertones of the Filipinos who are living in poverty. The film depicts the life of ordinary people in the slum area, Quiapo. During this year, Martin also starred on various indie films such as "Pi7ong Tagpo" and "Nars"	under Carl & Carl Productions and CCM Creatives. Martin acted in his first Cinema One Originals entry "Tambolista" alongside Jiro Manio and Sid Lucero, and directed by Adolfo Alix, Jr. The film portrays an intimate portrait of two brothers struggling with life's trials and tribulations and seeking their particular redemption. The film won  critical acclaim and became the premiere movie at the Rotterdam Film Festival in 2008. It was also featured in the Munich International Film Festival in Germany, Barcelona Asiatica Film Festival, and Cinema Asiatica Nuovo de Madrid in Spain. In 2007, Martin appeared as a supporting actor for the first time in a mainstream film under GMA Films titled Batanes: Sa Dulo ng Walang Hanggan alongside Iza Calzado and Taiwanese actor, Ken Chu of F4. Martin also appeared in Season 15 of Daisy Siete, "Isla Chikita" under GMA Network, his first-ever TV series. In 2008, Martin returned to indie films starring with "Condo" under Breaking The Box Productions directed by Martin Cabrera. He starred as an idealistic security guard named Benjamin Castro Jr. and it gave viewers a perspective on the life of a security guard and the people he interacts with on the job.

In 2008, Martin starred again in another critically acclaimed indie film Daybreak, a Philippine gay film written by Charliebebs Gohetia and directed by Adolf Alix, Jr. Martin portrays the role of a boatman who becomes sexually and romantically involved with another man played by Paolo Rivero. In the same year, Martin once again top-billed alongside Jaclyn Jose and Gina Pareno in an award-winning film, Serbis directed by Mendoza. The film competed for the Palme d'Or in the main competition at the 2008 Cannes Film Festival and became the first Filipino film to compete at the main competition in Cannes, since Lino Brocka's Bayan Ko: Kapit sa Patalim in 1984. The film won numerous awards at the 2008 Gawad Urian Awards and at the 3rd Asian Film Awards. Martin returned to the Cinemalaya film festival in 2008 with the film, "Jay" alongside Baron Geisler. The film was directed by Francis Pasion and tackles how media is able to create its own version of the truth. It challenges the audience to be critical and discerning of whatever they see on television or film. This film gave Martin his three Best Supporting Actor Awards at the 2009 Gawad Urian Awards, 2009 ENPRESS Golden Screen Awards, and 2009 Gawad Genio Awards. His contributions to the Philippines independent filmmakers led the media to dub him the "Prince of Philippine Independent Films."

2009–2014: Television projects and rise to fame
In late 2008 while accomplishing success in the indie films, Martin started doing television series and was cast in Ligaw na Bulaklak, his first ABS-CBN series. In 2009, he starred in the drama series Tayong Dalawa with Kim Chiu, Gerald Anderson, and Jake Cuenca where he won Best Drama Actor at the 2009 Star Awards for Television. After Tayong Dalawa, he starred in a remake of a 1990 film titled Nagsimula sa Puso, alongside Maja Salvador, Jason Abalos and Nikki Gil. Because of these projects, Martin was offered contract with Star Magic, ABS-CBN's biggest talent agency.

In 2010, he became part of the cast of ABS-CBN's primetime drama Kung Tayo'y Magkakalayo, and had his first leading role in the action series Tonyong Bayawak. The action series is the third installment of ABS-CBN weekly mini-series Agimat: Ang Mga Alamat ni Ramon Revilla ("Amulet: The Legendary Chronicles of Ramon Revilla"). He also starred in his first mainstream film under Star Cinema, Sa 'yo Lamang, and in the primetime series 1DOL with Sarah Geronimo and Sam Milby.

Despite his success in television, Martin starred in another award-winning, critically acclaimed indie film, Kinatay directed by Brillante Mendoza in 2009. The film premiered at the 62nd Cannes Film Festival, where it won the Best Director Award, the first Filipino film to do so. The film gave Martin his Best Actor Award at the 7th Golden Screen Award and Presidential Jury Award for Excellence in Acting at the 2009 Gawad Tanglaw Awards. He was also nominated for Best Actor at the 2009 FAMAS Award. The following year, Martin got his first top billing in an indie film, 

"Noy,"  produced by Star Cinema and directed by Dondon Santos. The film was selected as the Filipino entry for the Best Foreign Language Film at the 83rd Academy Awards, but didn't make the shortlist. It was a story about a journalist commissioned to come up with a documentary following the campaign of the character's namesake,  Sen. Benigno "Noynoy" Aquino III, who later became 15th president of the Philippines. In 2011, he led the acclaimed television series Minsan Lang Kita Iibigin, wherein he received the Dekada Award in the Gawad Urian ceremony. He was nominated for multiple awards for his portrayal as Alexander and Javier del Tierro in the series, and won Best Actor in the 20th KBP Golden Dove Awards and Best Drama Actor at the 25th Star Awards for TV.

In 2012, Martin starred in another ensemble series titled Walang Hanggan, an adaptation of the 1991 film Hihintayin Kita sa Langit. He was paired with Julia Montes, as his first official love interest. Because of the success of the series, Coco Martin was dubbed the "Prince of Philippine TV Series". He also starred in his second mainstream film entitled Born to Love You, opposite singer Angeline Quinto.  Later, he was cast in a romantic-comedy film directed by John D. Lazatin, Mae Czarina Cruz-Alviar, Frasco Santos Mortiz and Dado C. Lumibao titled, 24/7 in Love. In the same year, a script for a film called Juan dela Cruz was submitted to the 2012 Metro Manila Film Festival but failed to make the final list of entries. The entry, directed by Richard Somes, was one of the 7 rejected scripts. Because of this, Cinemedia Films Production Incorporated and ABS-CBN Dreamscape Entertainment unit head Deo Endrinal decided to retool the cancelled film as a television series, which was aired in 2013 with Erich Gonzales. The series had positive reviews and Martin became a household name. The series earned him another Best Actor Award at the 27th Star Awards for Television and at the 12th Gawad Tanglaw Awards.

In 2012, Martin starred in a film by Emmanuel Quindo Palo titled Sta. Niña along with Alessandra de Rossi, Anita Linda and Irma Adlawan. The film was an official entry for the New Breed Full Length Feature Category at the 8th Cinemalaya Independent Film Festival. The film also won "The Golden Crow Pheasant Award for Best Feature Film" aka Suvarna Chakoram at the 17th International Film Festival of Kerala in India.

Having worked with Director Palo in Sta. Nina, Martin was chosen to star in a 2013 film A Moment in Time together with Julia Montes as his leading lady. The film was shot in Amsterdam and Paris, and was produced by Dreamscape Cinema and Star Cinema. His performance earned him, a nomination for Best Drama Actor at the 2014 FAMAS Awards.

In 2014, Martin starred in Maybe This Time, a film with singer-actress Sarah Geronimo produced by Star Cinema and VIVA Films. In the same year, Martin starred with Kris Aquino in his first ever Metro Manila Film Festival film. The film was a sequel to a 2004 film of the same title also starring  Aquino. The film became the second-highest-grossing film at the 2014 Metro Manila Film Festival behind The Amazing Praybeyt Benjamin and holds the title of having the highest opening gross of any Filipino horror film. It earned a total of ₱235.0 million at the box office. In the same year, Martin also starred in the period drama television series entitled Ikaw Lamang with Julia Montes, Kim Chiu and Jake Cuenca. The series earned Martin "Best Performance by an Actor in a TV Series" at the 13th Gawad Tanglaw Awards and "Best Drama Actor" at the 28th PMPC Star Awards for Television.

2015–2022: Ang Probinsyano and critical success
In early 2015, he starred in a Philippine fantasy-drama anthology WansapanaSummer entitled "Yamishita's Treasures" alongside his leading lady Julia Montes. He also appeared in an episode of Maalaala Mo Kaya co-starring Angel Locsin and Ejay Falcon that was dedicated to the memory of Special Action Force members killed in the Mamasapano clash.

In September 2015 with an ensemble cast, Martin starred in his most successful television series to date, the TV adaptation of the late Fernando Poe Jr.'s film FPJ's Ang Probinsyano, . To portray the role, he had to train in martial arts such as Kickboxing, Arnis, and MMA. The program was originally set as a year-long series, but due to its continuous success and consistent top rating, it was extended indefinitely and finally ended on August 12, 2022. The longest-running television series, it lasted from September 28, 2015, to August 12, 2022, with a total of 1,696 episodes. Martin was given a certificate of appreciation for his portrayal of a highly dedicated CIDG Police officer. The citation was given during the 63rd Criminal Investigation and Detection Group (CIDG) Founding Anniversary. On 14 September 2016, Surigao congressman Robert Ace Barbers filed House Resolution No. 358 at the 17th Congress of the Philippines which commended the show for its efforts to promote crime awareness and prevention among viewers and endorsed Martin as "Celebrity Advocate for a Drug-Free Philippines." However, in 2018, the Philippine National Police (PNP) withdrew its support for "Ang Probinsyano" following its negative portrayal of the PNP in the television series. PNP spokesman Chief Superintendent Bong Durana said that an internal memorandum, signed by Director General Eduardo Garado, chief of the PNP Community Relations, was issued ordering all units, offices and personnel to refrain from assisting the producers of the series. In response to this, ABS-CBN has drafted a Memorandum of Understanding and has submitted it to the PNP for its comment, leading to a meeting with Martin, ABS-CBN Management, Department of Interior and Local Government (DILG) Secretary Eduardo Año along with PNP Chief Oscar Albayalde to resolve the issues. Due to the success of Ang Probinsyano, Martin was dubbed as the "King of Philippine Television" by various press and given numerous awards including the "Fernando Poe, Jr. Memorial award" at the 63rd FAMAS. In the same year, Martin starred in the film You're My Boss with Toni Gonzaga and in his second MMFF entry, Beauty and the Bestie with Vice Ganda, the third highest-grossing Filipino film of all time.

In 2016, he starred with superstar Nora Aunor in an indie film titled Padre de Familia directed by Adolf Alix Jr. The film was based on Martin's experiences working overseas. It premiered at selected cinemas in Europe and the Middle East via The Filipino Channel. In the same year, he starred in his third Metro Manila Film Festival entry, The Super Parental Guardians, along with Vice Ganda and Awra Briguela under Star Cinema. It was the second-highest grossing Filipino film of all time.

In 2017, Martin launched his own production company, CCM Productions, and had his first directorial and producer debut in the film Ang Panday, a 2017 Metro Manila Film Festival entry. The role was first popularized by late actor Fernando Poe Jr., hence, making it the second time Martin portrayed one of his roles. In 2018, he produced another film Jack Em Popoy: The Puliscredibles, a 2018 Metro Manila Film Festival entry and starred alongside GMA Network artists Maine Mendoza and Vic Sotto. In 2019, he produced, wrote, directed and starred in the 2019 Metro Manila Film Festival entry 3pol Trobol: Huli Ka Balbon! with Jennylyn Mercado and Ai-Ai delas Alas.

In 2021, Martin starred in a romantic comedy film Love or Money with Angelica Panganiban under CCM Productions and Star Cinema. The movie was filmed on various locations in Dubai, United Arab Emirates.

2022–present: Post-Ang Probinsyano projects
In July 2022, Metro Manila Development Authority announced the 4 initial entries for 2022 Metro Manila Film Festival, and Martin's film Labyu with an Accent together with Jodi Sta. Maria was included. Martin is set to appear again in the Brillante Mendoza film Apag alongside Lito Lapid, Gladys Reyes, Gina Pareño, Joseph Marco, Shaina Magdayao and Mercedes Cabral, an official entry for the 2023 Metro Manila Summer Film Festival. The role was initially pitched to Aljur Abrenica. He will also lead an indie horror film directed by Mendoza titled, Pola, together with Julia Montes. The film was shot in Pola, Oriental Mindoro, hence the title and is set to be released early 2023.

In February 2023, Martin together with actress Lovi Poe and an ensemble cast returns in the TV adaptation of the 1986 film Batang Quiapo. It was created by Pablo S. Gomez and starred the late Fernando Poe, Jr. Martin will also serve as the series' co-director, co-writer, and co-producer under his film production company.

Filmography

Acting roles

Directorial roles

Television

Feature films

Production company 

In 2017, Martin established his own film Production Company 'CCM Film Productions'. As of today, the company has produced three films since 2017: Ang Panday, Jack Em Popoy: The Puliscredibles, and 3pol Trobol: Huli Ka Balbon!, all of which are starred by Martin.

Feature films

Awards and nominations

References

External links 

1981 births
Living people
Filipino Roman Catholics
Filipino male models
Filipino stunt performers
Filipino film directors
Filipino expatriates in Canada
Star Magic
People from Quezon City
Male actors from Metro Manila
People from Pampanga
Kapampangan people
21st-century Filipino male actors
ABS-CBN personalities
GMA Network personalities
TV5 (Philippine TV network) personalities
Filipino male film actors
Filipino male television actors